Bronstein is the surname of:
 Lev Davidovich Bronstein, birth name of Leon Trotsky (1879–1940), Russian Marxist revolutionary and politician
 David Bronstein (1924–2006), Soviet chess Grandmaster
 Hila Bronstein (born 1983), German singer, known as a member of Bro'Sis
 Ilya Nikolaevich Bronstein (1903–1976), Russian applied mathematician
 Martin Bronstein, Canadian actor
 Matvei Bronstein (1906–1938), Soviet theoretical physicist 
 Michael Bronstein (born 1980), Russian-Israeli computer scientist
 Luis Marcos Bronstein (1946–2014), Argentine chess master 
 Olga Kameneva (née Bronstein) (1881–1941), sister of Leon Trotsky
 Phil Bronstein, editor of the San Francisco Chronicle
 Raphael Bronstein (1895–1988), violin performer and teacher

Other uses
Bronstein and Semendyayev, Handbook of mathematics, a classical book on mathematics originally issued in the 1940s
Bronstein-class frigate, United States Navy warships, originally laid down as ocean escorts, later redesignated as frigates

See also 
 Braunstein
 Brownstein

German-language surnames
Jewish surnames
Yiddish-language surnames

de:Bronstein